Gangapur is a city and a municipality in Bhilwara district in the state of Rajasthan, India.

Geography 
It has an average elevation of 495 metres (1624 feet).

History 
 
According to historical evidence, an ancient name of Gangapur was Lalpura, Gangapur is named after the death of Maharani Ganga Bai Scindia. It is host to the "Temple of Maharani Ganga Bai Sahib and Gaurav Hiran is the present King."

Demographics 
According to India's 2001 census, Gangapur had a population of 18777. Males constitute 52% of the population and females 48%. Gangapur has an average literacy rate of 59%, lower than the national average of 59.5%: male literacy is 73%, and female literacy is 45%. In Gangapur, 16% of the population is under 6 years of age.

The most commonly spoken language of Gangapur is Mewari.

References 

Cities and towns in Bhilwara district